Dihydrothiepine may refer to several isomeric chemical compounds:

 2,3-Dihydrothiepine
 2,5-Dihydrothiepine
 2,7-Dihydrothiepine
 4,5-Dihydrothiepine